Richland School District #400 serves the cities of Richland and West Richland, Washington. 

As of 2020, it serves approximately 13,900 students in grades pre-kindergarten through grade 12. 

The school district operates a total of 21 schools, including elementary, middle, and high schools. It also operates an early learning center and a virtual online program. The school district houses students in Delta High School and Tri-Tech Skills Center in partnership with both the Kennewick and Pasco school districts. 

The school district's superintendent, Shelley Redinger, has been serving since June 2020.

Schools

Elementary schools
Badger Mountain Elementary
Desert Sky Elementary, located in West Richland
Jason Lee Elementary
Jefferson Elementary
Lewis & Clark Elementary 	 
Marcus Whitman Elementary 	 
Sacajawea Elementary
Tapteal Elementary, located in West Richland 	
White Bluffs Elementary 
William Wiley Elementary, located in West Richland
Orchard Elementary

Middle schools
Chief Joseph Middle School
Carmichael Middle School
Enterprise Middle School, located in West Richland
Leona Libby Middle School, located in West Richland

High schools
Delta High School, in partnership with the Kennewick and Pasco school districts
Hanford High School, located in northern Richland	
Richland High School, located in central Richland
River's Edge Alternative High School

Schools that are closed
Spalding Elementary School (constructed in 1940's, now Liberty Christian School)
Hanford Elementary School
Hanford Middle School

Stadium

Fran Rish Stadium

References

External links 
 Richland School District website
 Richland School District WASL scores

Tri-Cities, Washington
School districts in Washington (state)
Education in Benton County, Washington
Richland, Washington